The North East Rugby League Premier Divisions is the top league in a 2 division structure in rugby league's tier 4. It is competed for by teams in the North East of England, Cumbria and North Yorkshire though in the past occasionally teams from West Yorkshire took part.

Many of the teams also run age group teams in the North East Junior League.

History

The Rugby League Conference was founded in 1997 as the Southern Conference, a 10-team pilot league for teams in the South of England and the English Midlands. The Conference began to include sides from the North of England from the 1999 season in a new Northern division though none of the teams were from the North East.

The Northern Rugby League Summer Conference was founded in 2000 outside the Rugby League Conference structure for teams in the North East of England and various British Amateur Rugby League Association leagues. The Rugby League Conference added a North East division for the 2001 season featuring many of the Northern Conference sides.

The RLC Premier divisions were set up in 2005 and Jarrow Vikings, Peterlee Pumas and Sunderland City joined the North Premier with the rest of the sides coming from Cumbria.

The Premier divisions saw a change in boundaries in 2006 leaving the North Premier division covering a larger area to give the English Midlands clubs their own premier division without having to face heartland teams, no North East teams would take part in this season's North Premier. Winlaton Vulcans were replaced by Gateshead Storm A. Jarrow Vikings, Peterlee Pumas and Sunderland Nissan took part in the newly North regional division against teams from Cumbria.

The promotion of three teams to the RLC National Division left the already depleted Premier North unviable and an artificial North Premier was created out of two of the North East and North regional divisions. The North East division was scrapped and did not return until the 2009 season.

In 2011 the league was split into 2 divisions (premier and regional). In 2012 it became a stand-alone league.

Rugby League Conference Pyramid

 National Conference League
 North East Rugby League Premier Division
 North East Rugby League Regional Division

2012 Structure

In the Premier Division, teams play each other three times making fifteen rounds before the end of season play-offs. Teams play each other twice making 14 rounds in the regular season in the regional division.

Participating teams by season

Rugby League Conference North East Premier Division
 2011: Gateshead Spartans, Gateshead Storm, Jarrow Vikings, Peterlee Pumas, Sunderland City, Wallsend Eagles

North East Rugby League Premier Division
 2012: East Cumbria Crusaders, Gateshead Spartans, Gateshead Storm, Jarrow Vikings, Peterlee Pumas, Sunderland City, Wallsend Eagles
 2013: Catterick Crusaders, Cramlington Rockets, Gateshead Storm, Jarrow Vikings, Sunderland City, Wallsend Eagles (Teesside Bulls failed to start the season and Miners failed to complete the season)
 2015 Cramlington Rockets, Durham Demons, Jarrow Vikings, Peterlee Pumas, Wallsend Eagles (Darlington failed to complete the season)

Winners

North East Rugby League Premier Division
2011 Peterlee Pumas  1
2012 Gateshead Storm 
2013 Gateshead Storm
2014 Jarrow Vikings
2015 Wallsend Eagles

1 (as Rugby League Conference North East Premier)

North East Cup
2013 Gateshead Storm
 2014 Gateshead Storm
 2015 Wallsend Eagles

North East Plate
2014 Cramlington Rockets
2015 Jarrow Vikings

External links
 North East rugby league site

Rugby League Conference
Sport in North East England
Rugby league in North Yorkshire
Sports leagues established in 2012
2012 establishments in England